Browning is an unincorporated community in Summers County, West Virginia, United States. Browning is located on the Greenbrier River, southeast of Hinton.

References

Unincorporated communities in Summers County, West Virginia
Unincorporated communities in West Virginia